PGC 10922 is a lenticular galaxy located 200 million light years from the Earth in the constellation Octans.

References

Lenticular galaxies
10922
Octans